Alexandru Ioan Lupaș (5 January 1942 – 14 August 2007) was a Romanian mathematician. 

He was born in Arad, where he attended the Moise Nicoară High School. He pursued his studies at Babeș-Bolyai University in Cluj, obtaining a B.S. degree in Mathematics in 1964.

That year he moved to Lucian Blaga University of Sibiu, starting as lecturer and advancing to full professor in 1990. He died in Sibiu.

References

External links
Professor Ph.D. Alexandru Lupaș at his 65th anniversary by Eugen Drăghici

1942 births
2007 deaths
20th-century  Romanian  mathematicians
21st-century  Romanian  mathematicians
Numerical analysts
Babeș-Bolyai University alumni
University of Stuttgart alumni
People from Arad, Romania